D'Onofrio (sometimes spelled Donofrio) is a surname of Italian origin. People bearing this name include the following:

Beverly Donofrio (born 1950), American author
Brian D'Onofrio, American psychologist
Carol D'Onofrio (1936–2020), American public health researcher
Denis D'Onofrio (born 1989), Italian footballer
Dominique D'Onofrio (1953–2016), Italo-Belgian football coach
Elizabeth D'Onofrio (born 1957), American film producer, actress, and acting coach; sister of Vincent D'Onofrio
Katerina D'Onofrio (born 1978), Peruvian actress
Mark D'Onofrio (born 1969), American former college football coach and former professional player
Nicola D'Onofrio (1943–1984), Italian Camillian monk
Vincent D'Onofrio (born 1959), American actor; brother of Elizabeth D'Onofrio

See also
D'Onofrio (brand)